Sphaerostoma is a genus of trematodes in the family Opecoelidae. It consists of one species, Sphaerostoma bramae (Müller, 1776).

References

Opecoelidae
Plagiorchiida genera
Monotypic protostome genera